Mounted in Alaska is an American reality television show that aired on the History Channel. The series follows the creative works of Knight's Taxidermy, Inc. located Anchorage, Alaska which is owned and operated by Russell Knight. The team focuses on hunting and fishing clientele, sometimes making mounts inside the client's homes. The team also specialize in taxidermy restoration and repair.

Knight's Taxidermy Staff
 Russel "Russ" Knight - Owner
 Kristina "Tina" Knight - Russ's Daughter / Hide Stretcher
 Doug Robinson - Shop Foreman / Shop Manager
 Dave Denslow - "The Fish Guy"; Taxidermist (specializing in Fish) / Carpenter / Mounter
 Sam Cook - "The Cat Man"; Taxidermist (specializing in Big Cats)
 Aaron Lawson - Taxidermist
 Ken Civian - Skinner / Flesher
 Merry Keogh - Secretary
 Dan Mulberry - Maintenance
 Tommy - Shop Finisher
 Jeremiah - Shop Grunt
 Terrence - Shop Intern

Episodes

Season One (2011)

References

External links
 Mounted in Alaska at History Channel
 Knight's Taxidermy Official Website

2011 American television series debuts
2010s American reality television series
History (American TV channel) original programming
Television shows set in Alaska
2011 American television series endings